Skateboards are personal wheeled vehicles consisting of a rounded rectangular flat board atop four wheels, in sets of two on two bogies, that travels along its long axis, used for recreation and sports.

Skateboard or variation, may also refer to:

 Skateboard (automotive platform), a type of vehicle chassis for electric vehicles
 Self-balancing scooter, aka "hoverboard", sometimes called skateboards
 Skateboard (film), 1978 U.S. sports drama film
 Skateboard GB, the governing body for skateboarding in the UK
 The Skateboard Mag, a defunct skateboarding magazine

See also

 Skateboarder
 Skateboarding
 Skateboard P., Pharrell Williams (born 1973), singer
 Electric skateboard
 
 
 Board (disambiguation)
 Skate (disambiguation)